KFR may refer to:
 Kettle Falls International Railway, a railroad operating in Washington and British Columbia
 WKFR-FM, a radio station serving Kalamazoo, Michigan
 The file format and extension used by Kalles Fraktaler
 Knattspyrnufélag Rangæinga, an Icelandic football club